Nicolaas Tates (born 5 May 1915 – 25 December 1990) was a Dutch canoeist who competed in the 1936 Summer Olympics.

He was born and died in Zaandam.

In 1936 he won the bronze medal in the folding K-2 1000 metre competition with his partner Wim van der Kroft.

References
DatabaseOlympics.com profile
Sports-reference.com profile

1915 births
1990 deaths
Dutch male canoeists
Olympic canoeists of the Netherlands
Canoeists at the 1936 Summer Olympics
Medalists at the 1936 Summer Olympics
Olympic bronze medalists for the Netherlands
Olympic medalists in canoeing
Sportspeople from Zaanstad
20th-century Dutch people